Dana Passage is a channel in the U.S. state of Washington.

Dana Passage was named after James Dwight Dana, a member of an 1841 exploring party.

References

Channels of the United States
Landforms of Mason County, Washington
Landforms of Thurston County, Washington